Eudonia passalota is a moth of the family Crambidae. It is endemic to the Hawaiian island of Maui.

External links

Eudonia
Endemic moths of Hawaii
Moths described in 1899